The will to power is a prominent concept in the philosophy of Friedrich Nietzsche and in the psychotherapy of Alfred Adler. The term may also refer to:

The Will to Power (manuscript), a posthumous publication of Nietzsche's notebooks
Will to Power (band), a dance music band from Miami whose name is taken from Nietzsche's concept
Will to Power (Will to Power album), an album by the band
Will to Power (Arch Enemy album), an album by Arch Enemy
Will to Power (film), a 2008 film
Will to Power (comics), a comic book mini-series from Dark Horse
Xenosaga Episode I: Der Wille zur Macht, a PlayStation 2 game

See also
Dominance (disambiguation)
Power (social and political)